Orbitz was a  short lived noncarbonated fruit-flavored beverage product made by The Clearly Food & Beverage Company of Canada, makers of Clearly Canadian. It was introduced in 1997 and quickly disappeared due to poor sales. In July 2013, Clearly Canadian stated that it was considering producing a limited run of new products to satisfy "nostalgia demand", with the possibility of annual issues thereafter based on consumer reception of the initial batch. Made with small floating edible balls, the drink was marketed as a "texturally enhanced alternative beverage" but some consumers compared it to a potable lava lamp.

The small balls floated due to their nearly equal density to the surrounding liquid, and remained suspended with the assistance of gellan gum.  The gellan gum provided a support matrix and had a visual clarity approaching that of water, which increased with the addition of sugar. The gellan gum created a very weak yield stress which has been measured to be ~0.04 Pa.
The product's website was bought by the Internet-based travel agency named Orbitz.

Unopened bottles from the drink's original launch have become a collector's item, appearing on online auction websites.

Flavors
Black Currant Berry
Blueberry Melon Strawberry
Pineapple Banana Cherry Coconut
Raspberry Citrus
Vanilla Orange

See also
 Bubble tea
 Basil seed drink
 List of defunct consumer brands

References

External links
 Extinct Beverage Tasting: raSpbeRrY CitRus Orbitz
 BevNET: Orbitz
 Clearly Canadian launches Orbitz in Canada
 Brad Tries: Orbitz

Soft drinks
Defunct drink brands
Products introduced in 1997
Canadian drinks